The 2018 New Mexico Bowl was a college football bowl game played on December 15, 2018, with kickoff scheduled for 2:00 p.m. EST (12:00 p.m. local MST). It was the 13th edition of the New Mexico Bowl, and one of the 2018–19 bowl games concluding the 2018 FBS football season.

Teams
The game featured Utah State from the Mountain West Conference and North Texas from Conference USA (C-USA). This was the eighth all-time meeting against the Mean Green and the Aggies, with Utah State leading the series, 4–3; this meeting was the first in a bowl game.

Utah State

Utah State accepted a bid to the New Mexico Bowl on December 2. The Aggies entered the bowl with a 10–2 record (7–1 in conference). Due to the resignation of head coach Matt Wells, who accepted the same position with the Texas Tech Red Raiders on November 29, the Aggies were coached in the bowl game by interim head coach Frank Maile. Utah State previously appeared in the 2014 New Mexico Bowl, defeating UTEP.

North Texas

North Texas accepted a bid to the New Mexico Bowl on December 2. The Mean Green entered the bowl with a 9–3 record (5–3 in conference). 
This was the first appearance by North Texas in a New Mexico Bowl.

Game summary

Scoring summary

Statistics

References

External links
 Box score at ESPN

New Mexico Bowl
New Mexico Bowl
New Mexico Bowl
New Mexico Bowl
North Texas Mean Green football bowl games
Utah State Aggies football bowl games